Tompkinsville is a home rule-class city in and the county seat of Monroe County, Kentucky, United States. The population was 2,402 at the 2010 census, down from 2,660 in 2000. The city was named after Vice President Daniel D. Tompkins who served under President James Monroe, for whom the county was named.

History
In 1804, the Old Mulkey Meetinghouse was built and is today part of the Old Mulkey Meetinghouse State Historic Site. At this site, a graveyard is home to deceased veterans of both the American Revolutionary War and the American Civil War. Daniel Boone's sister, Hannah, is also buried there.  

During the Civil War, Tompkinsville was the site of Confederate General John Hunt Morgan's first Kentucky raid. July 9, 1862, Morgan's Raiders, coming from Tennessee, attacked Major Thomas J. Jordan's 9th Pennsylvania Cavalry. Raiders captured 30 retreating Union soldiers and destroyed tents and stores. They took 20 wagons, 50 mules, 40 horses, sugar and coffee supplies. At Glasgow, Kentucky they burned supplies, then went north, raiding 16 other towns before returning to Tennessee.

Tompkinsville is also home to the famous Dovie's restaurant which has been known for its signature deep-fried hamburgers since 1938.

Geography
Tompkinsville is located at  (36.699508, -85.692005).

Demographics

As of the census of 2000, there were 2,660 people, 1,169 households, and 702 families living in the city. The racial makeup of the city was 89.47% White, 8.95% African American, 0.04% Native American, 0.08% Pacific Islander, 0.53% from other races, and 0.94% from two or more races. Hispanic or Latino of any race were 1.09% of the population.

There were 1,169 households, out of which 26.3% had children under the age of 18 living with them, 40.3% were married couples living together, 16.4% had a female householder with no husband present, and 39.9% were non-families. 37.8% of all households were made up of individuals, and 18.4% had someone living alone who was 65 years of age or older. The average household size was 2.16 and the average family size was 2.84.

In the city, the population was spread out, with 21.9% under the age of 18, 8.5% from 18 to 24, 25.3% from 25 to 44, 21.9% from 45 to 64, and 22.4% who were 65 years of age or older. The median age was 41 years. For every 100 females, there were 76.0 males. For every 100 females age 18 and over, there were 72.8 males.

The median income for a household in the city was $18,267, and the median income for a family was $23,361. Males had a median income of $21,587 versus $16,541 for females. The per capita income for the city was $15,975. About 24.5% of families and 29.0% of the population were below the poverty line, including 35.8% of those under age 18 and 23.9% of those age 65 or over.

Education
Tompkinsville has a public library, the William B. Harlan Memorial Library.

Notable people

Tim Lee Carter, U.S. representative from Kentucky
James Comer, Kentucky Commissioner of Agriculture, U.S. representative
Joe H. Eagle, U.S. representative from Texas
Tom Emberton, politician and judge
Elois Grooms, former defensive lineman in the National Football League
Eagle Keys, football coach and player of Canadian football
Samuel B. Maxey, major general for the Confederacy in the Civil War who later represented Texas in the U.S. Senate
Shawn McPherson, member of the Kentucky House of Representatives
Pearl Carter Pace, first woman sheriff in Kentucky

References

Cities in Monroe County, Kentucky
Cities in Kentucky
County seats in Kentucky